Børre Skui (born 6 July 1958) is a former Norwegian sailor. He was born in Porsgrunn. He participated at the 1984 Summer Olympics in Los Angeles, where he placed fifth in the Soling class, together with Dag Usterud and Stein Lund Halvorsen.

References

1958 births
Living people
Sportspeople from Porsgrunn
Norwegian male sailors (sport)
Olympic sailors of Norway
Sailors at the 1984 Summer Olympics – Soling